"Over the Love" is a song recorded by English indie rock band Florence and the Machine for the soundtrack to Baz Luhrmann's 2013 film adaptation of F. Scott Fitzgerald's 1925 novel, The Great Gatsby. It appears as the seventh track on the soundtrack. The song was released as the first promotional single from the album on 17 April 2013, available to stream on SoundCloud in the weeks leading up to the soundtrack's release.

Composition
"Over the Love" is a ballad that builds towards the end and talks about a girl crying over the love for her boyfriend and the distance that separates them.

The lyrics of the song reference symbols from F. Scott Fitzgerald's novel, like the yellow dress Daisy wears and the green light that appears outside her home in East Egg's dock. Moreover, the line "'Cause you're a hard soul to save with an ocean in the way, but I'll get around it" symbolizes the space between East Egg and Long Island Sound in West Egg where Gatsby awaits Daisy. An alternative interpretation would be that it is a reference to the Atlantic. It was Gatsby's service in World War I that originally separated Daisy and Gatsby. Yet another interpretation is that the line refers to Gatsby's unshakable determination which is both a source of his strength as well as the cause of his downfall.

In the novel, Nick describes a woman in a yellow dress who is wailing next to the piano at the end of the first party he attended. Another woman tells Nick she "had a fight with a man who says he's her husband." Her tear-stained face is smudged with mascara and guests are telling her to sing the notes on her face.

The lyrics "Now there’s green light in my eyes" and "I can see the green light, I can see it in your eyes", bring a connection to the metaphors of the green light of the lighthouse constantly described in the book.

Critical reception
"Over the Love" received universal acclaim. Fans' reaction toward the song has been overwhelmingly positive. Pretty Much Amazing gave a positive review saying, "Florence + the Machine’s “Over [the] Love” is our first taste of that record, and I believe GQ is correct in saying this is sung from Daisy’s perspective. Welch is in great form on the track and it leaves me rewatching its trailers, excited to see the film–all intellectual quandaries aside." Perez Hilton acclaimed the song saying, "Florence + [the] Machine has delivered a powerfully emotional song for the film, ["Over the Love"]. With AH-Mazing vocals and lyrics referencing Daisy’s yellow dress and other Gatsby moments, this song has us barely able to wait for the film."

"Over the Love" received a very positive review from Page to Premiere, calling it "absolutely amazing." Hypetrak praised the song saying the song "is an undeniably powerful and impactful number, as Florence does so often, showcasing her strong and unwavering vocals throughout." Spin simply called the song "epic and tragic."

Release history

References

2013 songs
2010s ballads
Florence and the Machine songs
The Great Gatsby
Song recordings produced by Emile Haynie
Songs written by Florence Welch
Songs written by Kid Harpoon